Andrew "Andy" Myler (born 2 December 1975, Dublin) is a former League of Ireland footballer, and current manager of UCD AFC

Playing career
He began his professional career at UCD where he made his League debut at St. James's Gate F.C. on 9 January 1994. He scored his first league goal on his first start at Longford Town on 27 March 1994. His first league hat trick was against Finn Harps on 6 September 1996. 

He also played for Newry Town, Monaghan United, Athlone Town, Waterford United and Drogheda United before Longford.
He claims that his happiest days as a footballer came with Drogheda United where he has officially been accepted into the club's hall of fame. He is now known as a legend in Drogheda and his name is still sung week in week out by the Drogheda fans. 

Andy was signed by Shamrock Rovers from Longford Town in July 2006 making his debut against Galway United on 4 August.

Always a Rovers fan, Andy broke into the top 20 all time League of Ireland goal scorers in August 2007.

His hat-trick on 14 September against Galway United brought his all-time league total to 129 goals

In his career he has been top scorer in the League of Ireland First Division for two seasons in 1999–2000 and 2000–01.

In his two seasons at Rovers Andy scored 20 goals in 48 total appearances.

He signed for Bray in December 2007

Myler retired at the end of the 2008 season with a total of 131 career league goals and scored in his last game As of 2012 Myler is sixteenth in the all-time League of Ireland goalscoring list with 131 league goals.

Coach
Andy moved on to managing the Shamrock Rovers reserve and youth teams. In his first season, he managed the Rovers team that won the 2009 A Championship. In his second season, he managed the U20s as they won the League of Ireland U20 Division title . He was promoted to the first team staff in 2011 where he was part of the Premier Division league winning and Europa League qualifying set up. Andy left Shamrock Rovers at the end of 2011.

Andy now managers first division side UCD, University College Dublin where he also works.

Honours

Player
UCD; 
League of Ireland First Division: 1
 1994–95
League of Ireland First Division Shield: 1
 1994–95
Leinster Senior Cup: 2
 1994–95, 1995–96
Shamrock Rovers
League of Ireland First Division: 1
 2006

Manager
Shamrock Rovers
A Championship: 1
 2009
League of Ireland U20 Division: 1
 2010

Individual
League of Ireland First Division Top Scorer: 2
 1999–2000, 2000–01

References

External links
Signs for Rovers – story from www.shamrockrovers.ie

1975 births
Living people
Association footballers from County Dublin
Republic of Ireland association footballers
Association football forwards
University College Dublin A.F.C. players
Monaghan United F.C. players
Athlone Town A.F.C. players
Waterford F.C. players
Drogheda United F.C. players
Longford Town F.C. players
Shamrock Rovers F.C. players
Bray Wanderers F.C. players
League of Ireland players
Newry City F.C. players
NIFL Premiership players
A Championship managers
Republic of Ireland football managers